The Lied Center for Performing Arts (frequently shortened to Lied Center) is a multi-venue performing arts facility in Lincoln, Nebraska, United States. It opened in 1990 on the southwest edge of the University of Nebraska–Lincoln's City Campus. The main stage at the Lied Center has a seating capacity of 2,258 and is primarily used for orchestra, theatre, and speaking events.

History

Fundraising for a dedicated performing arts facility on campus at the University of Nebraska–Lincoln (NU) began in the early 1980s under the leadership of University of Nebraska Foundation president Woody Varner. Seventy-one donors contributed to the project, which also received public funding, and Varner's fundraising goal was met in 1986. Omaha-based HDR, Inc. was selected as the primary architecture firm for the project and Paul Veneklasen was used as an acoustics consultant. Construction began on October 13, 1986 on the corner of 12th and Q Streets in downtown Lincoln, on the southwest corner of NU's City Campus. The facility was completed in 1990; Opera Omaha performed Madama Butterfly to open the facility on March 17, 1990. The center was dedicated as the Lied Center for Performing Arts in memory of Ernst and Ida Lied, whose foundation made a significant contribution to the project. The Lied Center of Kansas, which was opened in 1993 at the University of Kansas, is also named for the couple.

While most performing arts venues are designed with neutral colors, the main theater at the Lied Center uses terracotta "walls" (actually acoustic mirrors) and red seats; these warmer colors "match the spirit of the people of Nebraska." The main theater has dressing rooms at stage level, a rarity, allowing performers to quickly make their way on stage. 

The Lied Center saw a significant attendance decline following the height of the COVID-19 pandemic, with crowds often at twenty-five percent of capacity. The facility was largely self-sustaining prior to the pandemic, receiving approximately five percent of its revenue from the University of Nebraska–Lincoln.

In 2021, NU began a series of expansions and renovations to the Lied Center designed to expand lobby space and reduce wait times for patrons entering the facility. The $25.5 million project was mostly privately funded. At the same time, the university approved construction of a $75 million building to replace the Westbrook Music Building as the home of the Glenn Korff School of Music.

Layout
The Lied Center contains three performance spaces: the Lied Center Main Stage, which seats 2,258 and is the facility's primary performance area; the Carson Theater, a black box theater named after Johnny Carson used for smaller productions; and the Lied Commons, an event space for cultural programs, education events, and private receptions. Kimball Hall, which is located just north of the Lied Center and houses NU's Glenn Korff School of Music, is also operated by the Lied Center and can provide seating for 850 spectators.

Events
Since its opening in 1990, the Lied Center has served as one of the primary entertainment venues in Lincoln. Among the bands, speakers, and comedians who have performed at the facility are The Moody Blues, B.B. King, Willie Nelson, "Weird Al" Yankovic, Jerry Seinfeld, Mannheim Steamroller, Bill Cosby, Foreigner, and Crosby, Stills & Nash.

References

University of Nebraska–Lincoln
Buildings and structures in Lincoln, Nebraska
University and college arts centers in the United States
Theatres in Nebraska
Tourist attractions in Lincoln, Nebraska